Del Buono is an Italian surname that may refer to
Candido Del Buono (1618–1676), Italian maker of scientific instruments
Federica Del Buono (born 1994), Italian middle-distance runner 
Gianni Del Buono (born 1943), Italian middle-distance runner, father of Federica
Paolo Del Buono (1625–1659), Italian maker of scientific instruments, brother of Candido
Marco del Buono (1402–1489), painter and woodworker

See also
Buono (surname)

Italian-language surnames